Abraham Epiphanios  is the metropolitan of the Mavelikara Diocese of Malankara Orthodox Syrian Church. He was previously the metropolitan of Sulthan Bathery diocese and the assistant metropolitan of Bangalore Diocese. He was born on 17 September 1960 in Kozhenchery. He is a member of St. Mary's Cathedral, Malaysia.

Ephiphanios had his education in Pathanamthitta Catholicate College, the Orthodox Theological Seminary and took M.Th. degree from Serampore University. He was ordained as deacon in 1986 and priest in 1987 respectively; on 31 March 2002 he became Ramban. He was in the ashrams in Parumala and Madras from 1990 to 1996. He also served as Vicar of St. Thomas Cathedral from 1996 to 2002.

Thereafter he served as the Manager of Bishop's House, Madras in 2003. From 2004 to 2006 he was the Manager at Parumala Seminary and from 2007 he served as the Manager of Devalokam Catholicate Aramana.

References

Living people
1960 births
Malankara Orthodox Syrian Church bishops
20th-century Oriental Orthodox clergy
21st-century Oriental Orthodox archbishops